Mariam bint Abu Ya'qub Ashshilbi (Arabic: مريم بنت أبي يعقوب الشَّلْبي) was an 8th-century Arabic-language poet of al-Andalus.  She was born in Shilb (modern Silves, Portugal) and settled in Seville, where she became a tutor of noblewomen.

Living during the time of the Moors, she has been referred to as the Arabian Sappho. During her time, many women of the Andalusian area cultivated the arts. Some well-preserved examples of her work survive in the library of the Escorial.

References

External links 

 

8th-century Arabic poets
People from Seville
Women poets from al-Andalus
8th-century people from al-Andalus
8th-century Arabs
Slaves from the Umayyad Caliphate
Slaves from al-Andalus